James Christian Hibbert is an English actor and writer. He is best known for his voice work with the animation studio Cosgrove Hall Films.

Early life
James Christian Hibbert was born as the eldest of three children of author Christopher Hibbert and Susan Hibbert. His younger brother was the late music journalist Tom Hibbert.

Career
After studying drama at the University of Manchester, he met CP Lee and Bob Harding, and the three of them formed the band Alberto y Lost Trios Paranoias in 1972, with Hibbert on vocals and bass. The band called it a day in 1982, and Hibbert got his first voice acting role for the Milk Marketing Board, doing an impression of Ian Dury.

Television
He has made a few on-screen acting appearances in British films and television programmes. These include:
Coronation Street
What the Papers Say
Cold Feet
The Grand
Medics
The Adventures of Sherlock Holmes
Prime Suspect
Children's Ward
Wipe Out
Floodtide
Room at the Bottom
The Practice
Teach Yourself Gibberish
Bloody Kids.

Voice acting
His voice acting for animation includes: 
 You're a Good Sport, Charlie Brown (1975, UK version) - Peppermint Patty
 Danger Mouse (1981–1992) – Doctor Augustus P. Crumhorn III and Additional Voices
 The Wind in the Willows (1984–1988) – Various Voices
 Alias the Jester (1985–1986) – Boswell, Queen Edith, Sir Pinkly Percival and Additional Voices
 The Reluctant Dragon (1987) – Various Voices
 Count Duckula (1988–1993) – Dr. Von Goosewing, Sviatoslav the Bat and Additional Voices
 The BFG (1989) – Various Voices
 The Wind in the Willows: A Tale of Two Toads (1989) – Isambard Bearbone Toad
 Victor and Hugo (1991–1992) – Victor
 The Fool of the World and the Flying Ship (1990) – Crown Prince of Anatolia, Boris and Pyotr
 Terry Pratchett's Truckers (1992) – Vinto Pimmie and Additional Voices
 Noddy's Toyland Adventures (1992–2000) – Big Ears, Mr. Plod and Additional Male Voices
 Avenger Penguins (1993–1994) – Bluey, Harry Slime, Bella, Brown Badly Drawn Brother and Poodle Stink
 Albert the 5th Musketeer (1994–1995) – Albert, Athos and King Louis XIII
 The Little Polar Bear (1994) – Various Male Characters
 Fantomcat (1995–1996) – Lindbergh the Pigeon, Vile the Bluebottle and Vinnie the Vole
 Sooty's Amazing Adventures (1996) – Scampi, Katerina and Additional Voices
 Dennis the Menace (1996–1998) – Jacques
 The Animal Shelf (1997–1999) – Gumpa, Woeful and Stripy
 Enid Blyton's The Magic Faraway Tree (1997–) – Various Voices
 Father Christmas and the Missing Reindeer (1998) – Various Voices
 Lavender Castle (1999–2000) – Sir Squeakalot, Dr. Agon, Short Fred Ledd and Trump
 The Foxbusters (1999–2000) – Todd, Volpone, Ghengis, Dog and Additional Voices
Millionaire Dogs (1999) - Emmo, Chuffie, Dr. Quack and Additional Voices (English dub, uncredited)
The Lampies (2000–2002) - Burnout, Charge, Dustywugg, Arch Roon and Additional Voices
 Bill and Ben (2001–2002) – Ben and Additional Voices
 Second Star to the Left (2001) – Various Voices
 Dr Otter (2001–2002) – Lucky, Flybread, Dunston, Mexley, Texley and Dexley
 The King's Beard (2001) – The Babble
 Sergeant Stripes (2003–2004) – Various Male Characters
 Little Robots (2003) – Stretchy
 Wide Eye (2003–2004) – 99, Rangatang and Wily Komodo
 Little Red Tractor (2004–2005) – Stumpy and Additional Voices
 The Magic Roundabout (2005) – Mr. Rusty, Mr. Grimsdale and Skeleton Guards
 The Secret Show (2007) – Various Voices
 Chop Socky Chooks (2008–2009) - Various Voices
 Frankenstein's Cat (2008) – Various Voices
 Zigby (2010) – McMeer and Bertie (UK Version)
 Toby's Travelling Circus (2012) – Various Male Characters
 Pip Ahoy! (2014–2018) – Hopper, Alan, Shelvis and Additional Voices
 The Smurfs: A New Touch of Blue (2021–present) - TBA

Writing
He has written for various shows, including:
My Parents are Aliens
The Legends of Treasure Island
Oakie Doke
Sooty's Amazing Adventures
Terry Pratchett's Discworld
Bob the Builder
Bill and Ben
Andy Pandy
Little Red Tractor
Little Robots
The Lampies
The Secret Show
Shaun the Sheep
Frankenstein's Cat
Chuggington
The Octonauts
Pip Ahoy!
Mr. Bean: The Animated Series
The Roly Mo Show
Planet Cook

Music videos
He appeared in Lunar C's 2017 music video Chicken, playing Lunar C's "uncle Daz," along with Stephanie Nuttal who played Lunar C's "mum."

Theatre
In 1977, he appeared on stage at London's Royal Court Theatre and Roundhouse as part of the Albertos' musical play Sleak, playing the lead role of Norman Sleak.

References

External links

 
 Just Voices Agency profile

Living people
British male television writers
English children's writers
English male screenwriters
English male voice actors
English television writers
Place of birth missing (living people)
Year of birth missing (living people)